The 2003–04 Georgetown Hoyas men's basketball team represented Georgetown University in the 2003–04 NCAA Division I college basketball season. The Hoyas were coached by Craig Esherick and played their home games at the MCI Center in Washington, DC. The Hoyas were members of the Big East Conference. They finished the season 13-15, 4-12 in Big East play. They lost to Boston College in the first round of the 2004 Big East men's basketball tournament and had no further postseason play. It was the first time since the 1973-74 season that Georgetown did not receive an invitation to either the NCAA Division I men's basketball tournament or the National Invitation Tournament.

Season recap

Senior forward and team co-captain Gerald Riley started all 28 games, completing his string of starting all 125 games of his collegiate career. With power forward  Mike Sweetney having left the team over the offseason, choosing to forgo his senior year to enter the National Basketball Association Draft, Riley became the teams offensive centerpiece, and he averaged 33 minutes a game for the year. He put in a strong performance early in the season as the team won its first ten games. Sophomore forward Brandon Bowman, meanwhile, also started all 28 games – as he would all 127 games of his collegiate career – and averaged 34 minutes per game. He scored in double figures 24 times and led the team in scoring 12 times. He also led the team in rebounding 20 times.

Sophomore guard Ashanti Cook became a starter this season, starting all 28 games, as he would every game for the rest of his collegiate career. He scored a season-high 18 points against Connecticut and his 106 assists for the year were twice as many as anyone else on the team. He shot 34.4 percent from the field and only 31.9 percent from three-point range, but averaged 9.2 points per game. Junior forward Darrel Owens started the season strong, averaging in double figures in early games and scoring 20 points against Boston College. He also had ten or more rebounds in two games.

The team opened the season 10-0, including a victory over Rutgers in the Big East opener, but it sorely missed the departed Sweetney and won only three more games as virtually the entire team slumped. Riley excelled in the two victories over Miami, scoring 35 points at Miami and then 37 points against the Hurricanes a week later at the MCI Center, the most points scored by a Georgetown forward in a single game since 1965. In the two Miami games combined, he shot 25-for-32 (78.1%) from the field and a perfect 16-for-16 from the free-throw line. Otherwise, however, his numbers went into decline as the teams fortunes fell. Owens also saw his performance drop; during Georgetowns season-ending nine-game losing streak, he never scored in double figures and averaged only 4.5 points per game. Among Hoya players, only Bowman did not slump. He led the team in rebounds in 15 of the last 17 games of the year. Though he also struggled at the onset of the nine-game losing streak, he shot 46 percent from the field during the final four games of the season compared to 31 percent for the rest of the team. The team averaged 52 points a game during its last four games, and Bowman was responsible for a third of them.

Losing 14 of the final 17 games of the regular season, the team finished the regular season at 13-14 overall and 4-12 in the Big East – the worst conference record it ever had in the 34-season history of the original Big East Conference – and tied for 12th place. It went into the 2004 Big East tournament with an eight-game losing streak and lost in the first round to Boston College. The tournament loss extended the teams losing streak to nine games, tying the school record for the most games lost in a row set by the hapless 3-23 team of 1971-72.

The teams 13-15 final record was the first losing record for a Georgetown team since the 1998-99 team went 15-16 and only the second since the 1972-73 team posted a 12-14 record. With no postseason play, Georgetown missed the NCAA tournament for the third year in a row and for the sixth time in seven years. Although the 2001-02 team had no postseason play after Esherick declined an invitation to the 2002 National Invitation Tournament (NIT), the 2003-04 team was the first Georgetown squad to receive no invitation to either the NCAA tournament or the NIT since 1973-74.

Esherick fired

Craig Esherick – a former Georgetown player who had served as a Hoyas assistant coach for 17½ seasons before succeeding John Thompson, Jr., as head coach in January 1999 – had posted a 103-74 (.582) record during his 5½ seasons as head coach. At the end of the 2002-2003 season, Georgetown had extended his contract through 2009. He indicated to the press late in the 2003-2004 season that his position as head coach was secure, that he had a good recruiting class joining the team for the 2004-2005 season – it included future stars Jeff Green, Roy Hibbert, and Jonathan Wallace – and that they should "stay tuned," and Georgetown president John DeGioia gave him a public show of support around the same time. On March 5, 2004, Esherick said, "I ain't going anywhere – I may be here for another 30 years."

However, after only one NCAA Tournament appearance during Esherick′s tenure, three consecutive seasons without an NCAA Tournament appearance, and a sub-.500 performance in 2003-04 that ended with the record-tying losing streak, DeGioia fired Esherick on March 16, 2004, just six days after the end of the season. Assistant coaches Mike Riley, Jaren Jackson, and Chuck Driesell also left the team at the end of the season, Riley after 22 seasons as an assistant coach at Georgetown and the other two after a single season of coaching the Hoyas.

Roster
Source

Rankings

The team was not ranked in the Top 25 in either the AP Poll or the Coaches' Poll at any time and was never among other teams receiving votes in either poll.

2003–04 Schedule and results
Sources
 All times are Eastern

|-
!colspan=9 style="background:#002147; color:#8D817B;"| Preseason

|-
!colspan=9 style="background:#002147; color:#8D817B;"| Regular season

|-
!colspan=9 style="background:#002147; color:#8D817B;"| Big East tournament

References

Georgetown Hoyas men's basketball seasons
Georgetown Hoyas
Georgetown Hoyas men's basketball team
Georgetown Hoyas men's basketball team